Stanley is an unincorporated community in Hart Township, Warrick County, in the U.S. state of Indiana.

History
A post office was established at Stanley in 1890, and remained in operation until it was discontinued in 1907.

Geography

References

Unincorporated communities in Warrick County, Indiana
Unincorporated communities in Indiana